Triana may refer to:

People
Andreya Triana, British singer-songwriter
Jorge Alí Triana (born 1942), Colombian theatre and film director
José Jerónimo Triana (1828–1890), Colombian botanist
 José Triana (athlete) (born 1935), Cuban sprinter
 José Triana (poet) (1931–2018), Cuban poet and playwright
Juan de Triana (fl. 1460 to 1500), Spanish composer of the Renaissance period
Raúl González Triana (born 1968), Cuba national football team head coach
Rodrigo de Triana (1469–?), shipmate of Christopher Columbus
Triana Iglesias (born 1982), Norwegian model and burlesque artist

Places
Triana, Alabama, a town, United States
Triana (Alenquer), a parish in the municipality of Alenquer, Portugal
Triana, Tuscany, a village, Italy
Triana, Seville, a large neighborhood of Seville, Spain
, a subdivision in the municipality of Vélez-Málaga, Spain
, a subdivision in the municipality of Las Palmas de Gran Canaria, Spain

Other uses
Triana (band), Spanish musical group
Triana (satellite), launched in 2015 as the Deep Space Climate Observatory
Triana Orpheus, fictional character in series The Venture Bros.
Puente de Isabel II, also called Puente de Triana, a bridge in Seville
Puerta de Triana, a former wall gate that was in Seville
, the name of more than one United States Navy ship

Spanish-language surnames